D' Originals is a 2017 Philippine television drama revenge series broadcast by GMA Network. Directed by Adolfo B. Alix Jr., it stars Jaclyn Jose, LJ Reyes and Kim Domingo. It premiered on April 17, 2017 on the network's Afternoon Prime line up replacing Pinulot Ka Lang sa Lupa. The series concluded on July 7, 2017 with a total of 60 episodes. It was replaced by Haplos in its timeslot.

The series is streaming online on YouTube.

Premise
The series focuses on how far the wives would go to catch their husbands, deal with the other women and keep their families and self-respect intact.

Cast and characters

Lead cast
 Jaclyn Jose as Jocelyn "Josie" Flores-Magpayo
 LJ Reyes as Marjorie "Marge" Pineda-Tolentino
 Kim Domingo as Sofia Abella-Godinez

Supporting cast
 Katrina Halili as Yvette Benitez
 Meg Imperial as Alice Perez
 Lovely Abella as Cristina "Tina" Pineda
 Jestoni Alarcon as Rolando "Lando" Magpayo
 Mark Herras as Carlos "Caloy" Tolentino
 Archie Alemania as Arthur "Art" Godinez
 Mikoy Morales as Tim Flores Magpayo
 Chlaui Malayao as Macy Flores Magpayo
 Elyson de Dios as Darren
 Arny Ross as Precious
 Dex Quindoza as Emman

Guest cast
 Coleen Perez as Sally 
 Elle Ramirez as Tanya
 Manuel Chua as Raul 
 Marx Topacio as Henry
 Antonette Garcia as Chef Ria
 Princess Guevarra as Angel 
 Mara Alberto as Joanna Marie 
 Kirst Viray as Richard
 Kenneth Ocampo as Mac 
 Arvic James Tan as Jason 
 Raquel Monteza as Minerva 
 Erlinda Villalobos as Manang Pacing
 Dex Quindoza as Emman
 Jasper Visaya as Dwight
 Rain Quite as Kenzo
 Aprilyn Gustillo as April
 Andrea Torres as Gina
 Ina Raymundo as Liza
 Imelda Papin as herself
 Kim Last as Dan
 Alonzo Muhlach as Thor Perez-Godinez
 Gardo Versoza as Greg "Chef Logo" Batumbakal
 Diana Zubiri-Smith as Isabel "Sabel" Buenaventura
 Maui Taylor as Gigi
 Andy Smith as Sofia's suitor

Episodes

April 2017

May 2017

June 2017

July 2017

Ratings
According to AGB Nielsen Philippines' Nationwide Urban Television Audience Measurement People in television homes, the pilot episode of D' Originals earned a 5.8% rating. While the final episode scored a 5.4% rating.

References

External links
 
 

2017 Philippine television series debuts
2017 Philippine television series endings
Filipino-language television shows
GMA Network drama series
GMA Integrated News and Public Affairs shows
Television shows set in Quezon City